Roland Gerber (20 May 1953 – 24 February 2015) was a German football coach and a former player. He spent seven seasons in the Bundesliga with 1. FC Köln and SV Darmstadt 98.

He died on 24 February 2015.

Honours
 Bundesliga champion: 1977–78
 DFB-Pokal winner: 1976–77, 1977–78
 DFB-Pokal finalist: 1979–80

References

External links
 

1953 births
2015 deaths
Deaths from pancreatic cancer
Deaths from lung cancer
German footballers
Germany B international footballers
German football managers
Bundesliga players
2. Bundesliga players
1. FC Köln players
1. FC Köln II players
SV Darmstadt 98 players
VfL Osnabrück players
Würzburger Kickers managers
Association football defenders
People from Lauda-Königshofen
Sportspeople from Stuttgart (region)
Footballers from Baden-Württemberg